Lloyd's List Intelligence-(formerly Lloyd's MIU)-LLc. Is now a specialist business incorporated with information service dedicated to the global maritime community. It is a sister company of Lloyd's List.

Overview 
Lloyd's List Intelligence, with a history of collecting maritime data dating back nearly 300 years, provides an interactive online service offering detailed vessel movements, real-time AIS positioning, comprehensive information on ships, companies, ports and casualties as well as credit reports, industry data and analysis including short-term market outlook reports. Lloyd's List Intelligence also provides a range of support services such as in-depth consultancy, investigations, due diligence, market trend analysis and credit risk appraisal for entire portfolios.

In Feb 2017, Lloyd's List Intelligence launch a newer platform known as Next Gen Lloyd's List Intelligence.

Lloyd's List Intelligence has a global presence with principal offices located in the UK, US, Singapore and Australia. In addition, Lloyd's List Intelligence directly employs expert analysts and researchers in Greece, India, Canada and China.

Information is sought from a multitude of sources and incorporates some of the most extensive resources available, including the world's largest AIS (Automatic Identification System) network, the largest online maritime database and the largest data bank of marine / energy / commodity company credit reports.

Its unique global network of specialist sources also includes the Lloyd's Agency Network of 700 agents and sub-agents for vessel movements' data, the leading registries and classification societies for vessel characteristics, and major company registries around the globe for corporate data.

History 
Founded on the heritage of the maritime industry bible Lloyd's List, it has a 300-year-old history in providing information to the maritime world. Tracking vessel movements has developed into a global competence since the early days - Lloyd's List got its name back in 1734, when it was a journal listing ship arrival and departures.

Today, Lloyd's List Intelligence brings together the expertise of a global staff of maritime analysts and journalists, with the most extensive system of shore based intelligence gathering to create the complete information support service for the maritime industry.

In 2022, Informa sold Lloyd's List Intelligence to Montagu Private Equity.

Services 

Lloyd's List Intelligence provides a wide range of services via industry-specific channels. Each channel provides a dedicated resource to that sector offering a combination of specialized industry data, tools and analysis as well as access to detailed vessel movements, AIS positioning and information on over 155,000 vessels, 165,000 maritime companies and details of 19,900 ports and terminals. This is all supplemented with the Ask the Analyst service, which offers direct access to a global team of expert analysts to perform business critical studies (including investigations, due diligence, in-depth competitor analysis).

Lloyd's List Intelligence channels include:
 Tankers
 Gas
 Dry Bulk
 Finance & Credit
 Law & regulation
 Insurance

Each channel is available as a standalone subscription or can be combined with additional channels and services to meet the individual needs of an organisation.

Other Services provided include discreet investigations into vessels, asset tracking, companies and due diligence, Lloyd's List Intelligence also offers the unique Portfolio Review Service (PRS) which can be used to assess the overall risk and credit exposures for entire portfolios. Individual credit reports can also be commissioned or existing reports can be purchased direct from their data bank of over 17,000 marine, energy and commodity company credit reports.

Data Sources 
Lloyd's List Intelligence employs over 200 staff across the globe. These include specialist journalists and 60 market and data analysts who collect and process information from 1,500 sources, 24 hours a day, 7 days a week, 365 days a year.

More than 1,400 locations are covered globally by land based AIS receivers to provide live coverage of over commercial ports and terminals in 132 countries. Over 100 million positions are reported every day from 40,000 unique vessels.

In addition, tracking is enhanced with satellite AIS reports as a result of an agreement with ORBCOMM Inc. Satellite AIS positions are recorded from 1Nm to more than 1,500Nm from shore, providing greater reporting where land based AIS is reduced.

Vessel movements are also uniquely corroborated by visual intelligence from thousands of exclusive contacts around the globe.

Key data suppliers include:

 Satellite AIS reports from ORBCOMM
 1,400 locations covered by land based AIS receivers
 700 Lloyd's Agents and Sub-Agents
 Classification Societies (IACS and non-IACS members)
 Flag Registries
 P&I Clubs
 Ship Owners
 Port Authorities
 Ship Brokers
 Insurers
 Coastguards and search and rescue centers
 Government and pan-government suppliers

References

External links
 Next Gen Lloyd's List Intelligence
 Lloyd's List Intelligence
 Lloyd's List
 Lloyd's List on Twitter

Business intelligence companies